The 2003 English cricket season was the 104th in which the County Championship had been an official competition. It was notable for the first official County Championship of the oldest county club, Sussex, and the first Twenty20 championship, the Twenty20 Cup.

South Africa toured England to compete in a test series which was drawn 2-2. Zimbabwe also toured England to compete in a two match test series with England. England won 2-0.

Honours
County Championship - Sussex
C&G Trophy - Gloucestershire
National League - Surrey
Twenty20 Cup - Surrey
Minor Counties Championship - Lincolnshire
MCCA Knockout Trophy - Cambridgeshire
Second XI Championship - Yorkshire II 
Second XI Trophy - Hampshire II 
Wisden - Chris Adams, Andrew Flintoff, Ian Harvey, Gary Kirsten, Graeme Smith

Test series

South African tour

Zimbabwe tour

County Championship

National League

C&G Trophy

Twenty20 Cup

Leading batsmen

Leading bowlers

References

External links
 CricketArchive – season and tournament itineraries

Annual reviews
 Playfair Cricket Annual 2004
 Wisden Cricketers' Almanack 2004

 2003